Canterbury is a town in Merrimack County, New Hampshire, United States. The population was 2,389 at the 2020 census. The Canterbury Shaker Village is in the eastern part of the town.

History 
First granted by Lieutenant Governor John Wentworth in 1727, the town was named for William Wake, Archbishop of Canterbury. It was originally a militia timber fort and trading post of Capt. Jeremiah Clough located on a hill near Canterbury Center, where the Pennacook people came to trade. The town would be incorporated in 1741. There were several garrison houses or stockades in the area as late as 1758.

Geography 
Bounded by the Merrimack River on the west, Canterbury is drained on the east by the Soucook River. Canterbury lies fully within the Merrimack River watershed.

Adjacent municipalities 
 Northfield (north)
 Gilmanton (northeast)
 Loudon (east)
 Concord (south)
 Boscawen (west)

Demographics 

As of the census of 2000, there were 1,979 people, 749 households, and 590 families residing in the town.  The population density was 45.1 people per square mile (17.4/km2).  There were 838 housing units at an average density of 19.1 per square mile (7.4/km2).  The racial makeup of the town was 98.59% White, 0.25% African American, 0.25% Asian, 0.05% Pacific Islander, 0.10% from other races, and 0.76% from two or more races. Hispanic or Latino of any race were 0.51% of the population.

There were 749 households, out of which 33.9% had children under the age of 18 living with them, 67.0% were married couples living together, 7.7% had a female householder with no husband present, and 21.2% were non-families. 15.1% of all households were made up of individuals, and 4.9% had someone living alone who was 65 years of age or older. The average household size was 2.64 and the average family size was 2.91.

In the town, the population was spread out, with 24.5% under the age of 18, 4.9% from 18 to 24, 25.6% from 25 to 44, 34.8% from 45 to 64, and 10.4% who were 65 years of age or older.  The median age was 42 years. For every 100 females, there were 93.3 males. For every 100 females age 18 and over, there were 93.4 males.

The median income for a household in the town was $58,026, and the median income for a family was $62,583. Males had a median income of $41,302 versus $32,313 for females. The per capita income for the town was $27,374.  About 2.0% of families and 2.5% of the population were below the poverty line, including 1.7% of those under age 18 and 2.0% of those age 65 or over.

Arts and culture

Annual cultural events
On the last Saturday in July, the town hosts the annual Canterbury Fair, which includes artisan performances, music performances and a 5K run.

The town hosts a regular Fourth of July parade as well a fireworks show by the town fire department.

Tourism
The biggest attraction in Canterbury is the Shaker Village, established in 1792. They made their living by farming, selling seeds, herbs and herbal medicines; and by manufacturing textiles, pails, brooms and other products. The last resident, Sister Ethel Hudson, died in 1992, and the site is now a museum, founded in 1969, to preserve the heritage of the utopian sect. It has been designated a National Historic Landmark for its architectural integrity and significance.

Canterbury has an active historical society hosting events throughout the year and maintaining the Elizabeth Houser Museum in the old Center Schoolhouse (original one-room school house) as well as an archive of Canterbury-related materials dating to the early 18th century. Among notable works in the archive are the Lunther Cody Collection of Glass Negatives, documenting classic life in New England.

Parks and recreation
Canterbury is home to Ayers State Forest and Shaker State Forest.

Notable people 

 Abiel Foster (1735–1806), US congressman, representative in the Continental Congress
 Stephen Symonds Foster (1809–1881), radical abolitionist
 Joseph M. Harper (1787–1865), US congressman, Acting Governor of New Hampshire
 Kenneth MacKenna (1899–1962), actor, film director
 Colby James West (born 1985), freestyle skier

Gallery

Images of Canterbury:

References

External links 
 
 
 New Hampshire Economic and Labor Market Information Bureau Profile
 Canterbury Fair

	

 
Towns in Merrimack County, New Hampshire
Towns in New Hampshire
New Hampshire populated places on the Merrimack River